Jonah Gokova is a Zimbabwe activist for the causes of feminism, preventing the spread of HIV/AIDS, LGBT rights, and African debt relief. In 2000, he served as the Chair for the Zimbabwe Coalition on Debt and Development, and was awarded the African Prize for Leadership in 2001. He currently serves as the Chairperson on the National Coordinating Committee for Padare, a non-profit dedicated to gender equality. His work counter's gender violence by promoting men's sensitivity to women, and challenging stereotypical notions of male masculinity and dominance over women.

Sources

References

External links
 

1956 births
Living people
Zimbabwean activists